Lokomotiva Stadium (Macedonian Cyrillic: Стадион Локомотива) is a multi-use stadium in Skopje, North Macedonia. It is currently used mostly for football matches and is the home of FK Lokomotiva Skopje. The stadium seats 500 people.

References

External links
Fotos Stadion Lokomotiva 
Macedonian Football 
Football Federation of Macedonia 

Football venues in North Macedonia